The men's quadruple sculls rowing event at the 2011 Pan American Games will be held from October 16–18 at the Canoe & Rowing Course in Ciudad Guzman. The defending Pan American Games champion is Yuleydis Cascaret, Janier Concepción, Ángel Fournier and Yoennis Hernández of Cuba.

Schedule
All times are Central Standard Time (UTC-6).

Results

Heat 1

Final A

References

'San Francisco'

Rowing at the 2011 Pan American Games